de Mailly is the name of the French noble family. Notable people with the surname include:

Augustin-Joseph de Mailly (1708–1794), French general
Diane Adélaïde de Mailly (1713–1769), French aristocrat
François de Mailly (1658–1721), French cardinal
Jean de Mailly, French Dominican chronicler
Louise Julie de Mailly (1710–1751), French aristocrat
Marie Anne de Mailly (1717–1744), French aristocrat
Pauline Félicité de Mailly (1712–1741), French aristocrat